Danny Saber (born 1966) is a musician in Los Angeles. He is an audio engineer, record producer, and remixer as well. He is a former member of Black Grape and Agent Provocateur. He plays organ, and keyboards, and is a prominent Los Angeles DJ.

Saber is known for diversity in his production and remixing. The genres of the artists with whom he has worked have included pop (Madonna, Seal), rock (David Bowie, U2, Michael Hutchence, The Rolling Stones), heavy metal (Ozzy Osbourne, Korn, Marilyn Manson), hip-hop (Busta Rhymes, Public Enemy, Jadakiss). Saber co-produced and performed on Alice Cooper's Along Came a Spider album, and has songwriting credits on eight of the eleven songs on the album.
He has scored film music and contributed music to a wide range of films (Blade II, Moulin Rouge!, Dallas 362, The Limey, Played). 

In 1999, Saber worked with Jack Dangers of Meat Beat Manifesto to form a project named Spontaneous Human Combustion. The project was unusual in that it was among the earliest to make and release music entirely online for free without the involvement of a music label.

Saber was also a judge for the 7th annual Independent Music Awards to support independent artists' careers.

References

External links

Saber Bytes

Living people
1966 births
American rock guitarists
American male guitarists
Record producers from California
Black Grape members
Guitarists from Los Angeles
20th-century American guitarists
20th-century American male musicians